Philosophy & Rhetoric is a quarterly peer-reviewed academic journal covering rhetorical theory, ethics, continental philosophy, informal logic, argumentation theory, critical social theory, and political theory. It is published by Penn State University Press and was established in 1968. The editor-in-chief is Erik Doxtader (University of South Carolina). The journal was established in 1968 by Henry Johnstone Jr. and Carroll Arnold, who saw a need for a journal that would, among other things, investigate "rhetoric as a philosophical concept".

Johnstone was the journal’s first editor, serving from 1967 to 1977, and then again from 1987 to 1997. Next to Johnstone, Gerard A. Hauser was the longest serving editor of the journal, filling the post from 1987 to 1993, and then from 2003 to 2017.

Abstracting and indexing
The journal is abstracted and indexed in the Arts and Humanities Citation Index, Current Contents/Arts & Humanities, International Bibliography of Periodical Literature, MLA International Bibliography, and Scopus.

Editors-in-chief
The following persons are or have been editor-in-chief:

Special issues
Occasionally, the journal publishes special issues dedicated to a specific subject. Past special issues have been:
2017 - Philosophy & Rhetoric at 50 - Edited by Gerard Hauser
2016 - Speech in Revolt: Rancière, Rhetoric, Politics - Edited by Michaele L. Ferguson
2015 - The Rhetorical Contours of Recognition - Edited by Sarah Burgess
2014 - Extrahuman Rhetorical Relations: Addressing the Animal, the Object, the Dead, and the Divine - Edited by Diane Davis and Michelle Ballif
2013 - Rhetoric's Contributions to the Study of Argumentation - Edited by Ralph H. Johnson and Christopher W. Tindale
2012 - Between Philosophy and Rhetoric--Essays in Honor of Michael C. Leff - Edited by Stephen Browne
2011 - On Walter Benjamin - Edited by James Martel
2010 - The New Rhetoric - Edited by James Crosswhite
2009 - France: Current Writing in Philosophy and Rhetoric - Edited by Philippe-Joseph Salazar
2008 - Inventing the Potential of Rhetorical Culture—The Work and Legacy of Thomas B. Farrell - Edited by Erik Doxtader
2007 - Philosophy & Rhetoric—40th Anniversary - Edited by Gerard Hauser
2005 - Emmanuel Levinas: The Rhetoric of Ethics - Edited by Claire Katz

References

External links
 

English-language journals
Penn State University Press academic journals
Publications established in 1968
Rhetoric journals
Quarterly journals